Loire-Authion is a commune in the Maine-et-Loire department of western France. The municipality was established on 1 January 2016 and consists of the former communes of Saint-Mathurin-sur-Loire, Andard, Bauné, La Bohalle, Brain-sur-l'Authion, Corné and La Daguenière. It takes its name from the two rivers Loire and Authion.

Population

See also 
Communes of the Maine-et-Loire department

References 

Communes of Maine-et-Loire
States and territories established in 2016